Jens Albinus (born 3 January 1965 in Bogense) is a Danish actor and director.

Selected filmography 
 Anton (1996) – as Lærer, a teacher
 Portland (1996) – as Carsten
 Bryggeren (TV mini series, 1997) – as Hans Christian Andersen
 The Idiots (1998) – as Stoffer
 Din for altid (short, 1999) – as Jeppe
 Zacharias Carl Borg (short, 2000) – as Zacharias Carl Borg
 Dancer in the Dark (2000) – as Morty
 The Bench (2000) – as Kim
 Gottlieb (short, 2001) – as Martin Gottlieb
 Far from China (2001) – as John
 Facing the Truth (2002) – as Richard Malmros
 Udvidelse af kampzonen (TV movie, 2002) – director and writer
 In Your Hands (2004) – as Carsten
 The Eagle (TV series, 2004–2006) – as Hallgrim "Ørn" Hallgrimsson
 The Boss of It All (2006) - as The Boss of It All/Kristoffer/Svend E
 Daisy Diamond (2007) - as Kunde
 This Is Love (2009) - as Chris
 Everything will be Fine (2010) - as Jacob Falk
 Borgen (TV series, 2010-2022) - as Jon Berthelsen
 Nymphomaniac (2013) - as S
 Silent Heart (2014) - as Michael
 Deutschland 83 (TV mini series, 2015) - as Henrik Mayer
 The Idealist (2015) - as Blicher
 My Little Sister (2020) - as Martin

References

External links 
 
 

Danish male film actors
Danish male television actors
People from Nordfyn Municipality
Best Actor Bodil Award winners
1965 births
Living people
Best Actor Robert Award winners